1983–84 San Diego Toreros men's basketball team represented University of San Diego during the 1983–84 men's college basketball season. The Toreros were led by head coach Jim Brovelli and played their home games at USD Sports Center. After having just a .500 conference winning percentage after six conference games, the team won their final six WCAC games to secure the regular season conference title. San Diego received a bid to the NCAA tournament where they lost in the play-in round to Princeton. It was the first time in program history the Toreros won the WCAC (now WCC) title as well as their first appearance in the NCAA Tournament. The team was led by all-conference forward Mike Whitmarsh, who was a runner-up that year for the conference player of the year award. Brovelli was named the conference coach of the year.

Roster

Schedule and results

|-
!colspan=9 style=| Regular season

|-
!colspan=9 style=| NCAA Tournament

Awards and honors 
Scott Thompson – WCAC Newcomer of the Year
Jim Brovelli – WCAC Coach of the Year

References 

San Diego
San Diego Toreros men's basketball seasons
San Diego
San Diego Toreros men's basketball
San Diego Toreros men's basketball